Sanduscolex is a genus of lower Ordovician palaeoscolecid.

References

Paleoscolecids
Fossil taxa described in 2014
Prehistoric protostome genera